Idaho's 2nd congressional district is one of two congressional districts in the U.S. state of Idaho, in the eastern portion of the state. Beginning with the 2012 election, the district expanded westward and now includes most of Boise, the state capital and largest city. The district is currently represented by Mike Simpson, a Republican of Idaho Falls. A former dentist in Blackfoot, he was first elected in 1998; the seat opened when his predecessor Mike Crapo successfully ran for the U.S. Senate.

History
After statehood in 1890, Idaho had a single seat in Congress through the 1910 election, a statewide at-large seat. Following the 1910 census, Idaho gained its second seat in the House; it was first contested in 1912, but the state did not immediately apportion into two districts.  Through the 1916 election, both were statewide at-large seats. The first election in Idaho with two congressional districts was in 1918.

Following the 2010 census and redistricting, the 2nd district was pushed slightly to the west, picking up much of northeast Ada County, including most of Boise. It now covers all of the capital north of Interstate 84. The 1st district had long been reckoned as "the Boise district", as it historically covered most of Boise. However, a significant increase in population directly west of Boise over the previous decade, in western Ada County and Canyon County, resulted in the 1st losing most of its share of the capital. The 1st continues to serve most of Boise's suburbs; in Ada County itself, it continues to include Meridian, Eagle, and west Boise, south of Interstate 84.

Other major cities in the 2nd district include Idaho Falls, Pocatello, Twin Falls, Rexburg, Hailey, and Sun Valley. The Church of Jesus Christ of Latter-day Saints has a strong presence in the district; a member of the LDS Church has represented this district continuously since 1951.

Recent statewide election results

Presidential election results
Results from previous presidential elections

Non-presidential results
Results from previous non-presidential statewide elections

List of members representing the district

Election history

2002

2004

2006

2008

2010

2012

2014

2016

2018

2020

2022

Historical district boundaries

See also
Idaho's congressional districts
List of United States congressional districts

References

 Congressional Biographical Directory of the United States 1774–present

02
Constituencies established in 1919
1919 establishments in Idaho